Lucille Berrien is an activist from Milwaukee.  She was good friends with fellow Open housing advocate James Groppi.  She ran for mayor of Milwaukee in 1972, becoming the first African-American woman to do so, but lost the race to incumbent Henry Maier.  Though she had recently joined the Black Panther Party, she ran a non-partisan race for mayor.  Berrien also ran for State Treasurer of Wisconsin in 1990 with the Labor–Farm Party of Wisconsin, but lost to Cathy Zeuske.

Berrien was a supporter of Milwaukee Alderperson Michael McGee Jr., even after his 2008 convictions for bribery and extortion, believing he was set up by the government.

In 2013, the Black Health Coalition of Wisconsin honored Berrien with one of the inaugural Community Health Champion Awards.

In April 2021 there was an effort to rename a Milwaukee park currently named for Charles Lindbergh in her honor. On October 23, 2021, the name of the park was officially changed in her honor to "Lucille Berrien Park".

References

Living people
1928 births
20th-century American women politicians
African-American people in Wisconsin politics
Politicians from Milwaukee
Members of the Black Panther Party
People from Florida
20th-century American politicians
21st-century American women